The Tammany Trace is a rail trail in St. Tammany Parish, Louisiana, occupying a former Illinois Central Railroad corridor.

It has been developed into a  asphalt trail for hiking, cycling, and wheelchair use. Some parts of the Trace include a separate equestrian pathway suitable for horse riding.

It connects Covington, Abita Springs, Mandeville, Lacombe, and Slidell, running along the northern shore of Lake Pontchartrain.  The trail was damaged by Hurricane Katrina in 2005, but was reopened by early 2007. The Trace is easily accessible from Fontainebleau State Park.

Location

See also 

 List of rail trails

References

Rail trails in Louisiana
Protected areas of St. Tammany Parish, Louisiana